Mathematical Models and Methods in Applied Sciences is a journal founded in 1991 and published by World Scientific. It covers: mathematical modelling of systems in the applied sciences(physics, mathematical physics, natural, and technological sciences); qualitative and quantitative analysis of mathematical physics and technological sciences; and numerical and computer treatment of mathematical models or real systems.

Abstracting and indexing 
The journal is abstracted and indexed in:

 Science Citation Index
 ISI Alerting Services
 CompuMath Citation Index
 Current Contents/Physical, Chemical & Earth Sciences
 Mathematical Reviews
 Inspec
 Zentralblatt MATH

External links 
 Journal Website

World Scientific academic journals
Mathematics journals
Publications established in 1991